or  is a fjord in Gratangen Municipality in Troms og Finnmark county, Norway. The municipality of Gratangen surrounds the fjord and is named after the fjord. At that point, the Årstein Bridge on Norwegian County Road 825 crosses the fjord.

The villages of Fjordbotn and Elvenes are located at the innermost part of the fjord. Årstein, Åkeneset, and Foldvik are located along the central part of the fjord. Myrlandshaugen and Hilleshamn are located at the mouth of the fjord.

See also
 List of Norwegian fjords

References

Fjords of Troms og Finnmark
Gratangen